Cogia caicus, known generally as the gold-costa skipper or caicus skipper, is a species of dicot skipper in the butterfly family Hesperiidae.

Subspecies
These two subspecies belong to the species Cogia caicus:
 Cogia caicus caicus (Herrich-Schäffer, 1869)
 Cogia caicus moschus (W. H. Edwards, 1882)

References

Further reading

 

Eudaminae
Articles created by Qbugbot